Ripe Cherries is a 1973 East German drama film directed by Horst Seemann. It was entered into the 8th Moscow International Film Festival.

Cast
 Günther Simon as Helmut Kamp
 Helga Raumer as Elfriede Kamp
 Traudl Kulikowsky as Ingrid Kamp
 Martin Trettau as Tiller
 Arno Wyzniewski as Dr. Beißert
 Eberhard Esche as Dr. Ika
 Fred Delmare as Lehnert
 Günter Wolf as Scholz
 Werner Lierck as Figaro
 Claudia Poppe as Helga Kamp
 Margarita Volodina as Swetlana Saizowa
 Karl Brenk as Hotelportier
 Willi Schrade as Kurt

References

External links
 

1973 films
1973 drama films
East German films
German drama films
1970s German-language films
Films directed by Horst Seemann
1970s German films